Raphaël Caucheteux  (born 9 May 1985) is a French handball player for Saint-Raphaël Var Handball and the French national team.

He was part of the French team that won the bronze medal at the 2018 European Men's Handball Championship.

References

1985 births
Living people
French male handball players
Sportspeople from Montpellier
Montpellier Handball players
Competitors at the 2009 Mediterranean Games
Mediterranean Games silver medalists for France
Mediterranean Games medalists in handball